David Northrup (born March 6, 1961, in Laramie, Wyoming) is an American politician and Republican Party member of the Wyoming House of Representatives representing the 25th district since January 10, 2023. Northrup represented the 50th district in the Wyoming House of Representatives from 2013 to 2021.

Education
Northrup graduated from Montana Tech of the University of Montana.

Elections
2012 Challenging incumbent Republican Representative Pat Childers for the District 50 seat, Northrup won the four-way August 21, 2012 Republican Primary with 613 votes (30.8%) against Childers and two others, and was unopposed for the November 6, 2012 General election.

References

External links
Official page at the Wyoming Legislature
 

1961 births
21st-century American politicians
Living people
Republican Party members of the Wyoming House of Representatives
Montana Technological University alumni
Politicians from Laramie, Wyoming